Belvedere Heights is a former unincorporated community now annexed to Riverside, California, in Riverside County, California. It lies at an elevation of 1237 feet (377 m).

References

Neighborhoods in Riverside, California